Aditi Ashok (born 29 March 1998) is an Indian professional golfer from Bangalore. She plays on the Ladies European Tour and LPGA Tour. She made her Olympic Games debut at the 2016 Summer Olympics. She qualified for the 2020 Summer Olympics in Tokyo, representing India in golf and finished 4th.

Personal life
Aditi was born in Bangalore to Ashok Gudlamani and Maheshwari. She was educated at The Frank Anthony Public School, Bangalore and  graduated in 2016. When she started playing golf at the age of 5, there were only three golf courses in Bangalore. When she expressed an interest, her father took her to the Karnataka Golf Association driving range. Her father Ashok was her caddie in the 2016 Olympics, while her mother Maheshwari Ashok was her caddie for the Tokyo 2020 Olympics.

Career
Aditi at the age of 12, played in the Asia Pacific Invitation tournament. When Aditi was 13, she became victorious in her first professional tour. She won the National Junior Championship three times in a row in 2012, 2013 and 2014. In 2014 she held junior and senior titles at the same time. She was the only Indian golfer, who played at Asian Youth Games of 2013, Youth Olympics and Asian Games - both in 2014.

After winning the Ladies British Amateur Stroke Play Championship in 2015 she turned pro on 1 January, 2016.

She became the youngest and first Indian to win the Lalla Aicha Tour School and secured her Ladies European Tour card for the 2016 season. This win also made her the youngest winner of a Q School for an international tour.

Aditi won the 2016 Hero Women's Indian Open with a score of 3-under-par 213, and in the process became the first Indian to win a Ladies European Tour title.  In a country normally focused on cricket, her win garnered outsized attention for the sport of golf. Her win made the front page of the country's largest newspaper, the Times of India and she was featured nationally on television. She picked up a second win two weeks later at the Qatar Ladies Open and finished the season second on the Order of Merit. She won the Rookie of the Year award. She also gained a LPGA Tour card for 2017 via the LPGA Final Qualifying Tournament.

In 2017, Aditi became the second LPGA player from India after Simi Mehra and finished eighth in the Louise Suggs Rolex Rookie of the Year standings.

In 2018, she made 17 cuts at 24 events, with two top-10 finishes. She recorded a career-best T6 result at the Volunteers of America LPGA Texas Classic (formerly Volunteers of America LPGA North Dallas Classic) and tied her career-low score of 64 at the Walmart NW Arkansas Championship. She ended the year with the second-lowest putting average on the LPGA.

In 2019, Aditi made 13 cut out of 22 LPGA Tour events, with best season finish of T13 at CP Women's Open. She ended the year with back-to-back second-place finishes on the Ladies European Tour.

2016 Olympic Games
At the 2016 Summer Olympics in Rio de Janeiro, Aditi was the youngest participant among all golfers. She finished in 41st place.

2020 Olympic Games
In 2021, Aditi represented India at the 2020 Summer Olympics in the women's individual stroke play event, in which she was ranked 200th in the world. Aditi finished fourth with a score of 269 and 15-under par, two shots behind gold medal winner Nelly Korda of the United States. After 54 holes, she was in the silver medal position, and was in medal contention for most of the fourth round.

Amateur wins
2011 USHA Karnataka Junior, Southern India Junior, Faldo Series Asia - India, East India Tolly Ladies, All India Championship
2012 USHA Delhi Ladies, USHA Army Championship, All India Junior
2013 Asia Pacific Junior Championship
2014 Eastern India Ladies Amateur, USHA IGU All India Ladies & Girls Championship
2015 Army Ladies & Junior Championship, St Rule Trophy, Southern India Ladies & Junior Girls Championship, Ladies' British Open Amateur Stroke Play Championship, Thailand Amateur Open

Source:

Professional wins

Ladies European Tour wins (4)
2016 Hero Women's Indian Open, Qatar Ladies Open
2017 Fatima Bint Mubarak Ladies Open
2023 Magical Kenya Ladies Open

Other wins
2011 Hero Professional Tour Leg 1, Hero Professional Tour Leg 3 (both as an amateur)

Team appearances
Espirito Santo Trophy (representing India): 2012, 2014

References

External links

Indian female golfers
Ladies European Tour golfers
LPGA Tour golfers
Olympic golfers of India
Golfers at the 2016 Summer Olympics
Golfers at the 2020 Summer Olympics
Golfers at the 2014 Asian Games
Asian Games competitors for India
Golfers at the 2014 Summer Youth Olympics
Golfers from Karnataka
Recipients of the Arjuna Award
Sportspeople from Bangalore
Sportswomen from Karnataka
1998 births
Living people
21st-century Indian women